is a sub-kilometer near-Earth object and potentially hazardous asteroid of the Apollo group, approximately  in diameter. The contact binary with a bilobated, peanut-like shape was first observed on 14 July 2002 by the LINEAR automated system in New Mexico. On 18 August 2002, it passed Earth at a distance of 540,000 km. It was observed with adaptive optics by the Midcourse Space Experiment.

Orbit and classification 

It orbits the Sun at a distance of 0.6–3.5 AU once every 2 years and 11 months (1,073 days; semi-major axis of 2.05 AU). Its orbit has an eccentricity of 0.71 and an inclination of 6° with respect to the ecliptic.

References

External links 
 Dictionary of Minor Planet Names, Google books
 Asteroids and comets rotation curves, CdR – Observatoire de Genève, Raoul Behrend
 Discovery Circumstances: Numbered Minor Planets (1)-(5000) – Minor Planet Center
 APOD Aug 17, 2002
 
 
 

Minor planet object articles (unnumbered)

Near-Earth objects in 2002
20020714